Li Hongkuan (born March 26, 1963) is a Chinese dissident.

Biography
Li Hongkuan was born in Dezhou, Shandong. He graduated from Nanjing University and Shanghai Institute of Biochemistry and Cell Biology, Chinese Academy of Sciences. After graduation, he became a teacher of Beijing Medical University (Today's Peking University Health Science Center).

In 1989, Li participated in Tiananmen Square protests and later was persecuted by the Communist Party of China. From 1991 to 1994, Li studied for a Ph. D. in Molecular Biology at Albert Einstein College of Medicine in New York.

In late 1997, Li began publishing online magazines under the name Big News. Li founded Small News, a news journal similar to Big News, in 1998. The aim of the two magazines is to break through the Great Firewall of China and send news about Chinese dissidents and Chinese Opposition Movement to the Chinese domestic e-mail address.

Li has also been interviewed by the Voice of America, Radio Free Asia, and other media, and also volunteering as current affairs commentators in some well-known programs.

In 1999, Li was awarded the "Prominent News and Culture Award".

See also
Chinese democracy movement
List of Chinese dissidents

Notes

1963 births
Living people
Chinese dissidents
Chinese democracy activists
Chinese human rights activists